Diary of a Wimpy Kid: Wrecking Ball is a children's novel written by Jeff Kinney and the fourteenth book in the Diary of a Wimpy Kid series. It was released on November 5, 2019. In this book, protagonist Greg Heffley's family receives an inheritance and they use the money to renovate their house. Wrecking Ball received positive reviews from critics.

Plot

Wrecking Ball is the 14th book in the  Diary of a Wimpy Kid series. The series follows an unlucky middle school student named Greg Heffley, his family, and his friends. The books are illustrated with simple, black-and-white drawings from Greg's perspective. Wrecking Ball focuses on Greg; his mother, Susan; his father, Frank; and his best friend, Rowley; as the Heffley family renovates their house and prepares to move to a new neighborhood.

In March, Greg goes through his closet for spring cleaning day and reminisces about various objects from his childhood. He then has a yard sale and hires Rowley to make sure nothing is stolen. When it starts raining, Greg's objects on sale are ruined, and he does not sell anything.

When Greg's great aunt Reba dies, Greg is very excited about receiving inheritance money. After a family meeting, Susan chooses to spend the money on expanding their house's kitchen. To prepare for the construction, Frank tries to teach Greg how to do chores around the house. Greg fears that a monster is in the plumbing while trying to unclog the drain. When Greg is instructed to paint around his family's hot tub, he discovers a wasp's nest. While cleaning the gutters, the ladder falls and Greg is stuck on the roof until he climbs in through the bathroom window. Susan hires professional workers, and Frank sends Greg outside to help them. A fight is started when Greg ruins one of the workers' lunch deliveries.

Greg is stressed due to a school-wide test, and he details that a large hole has been cut in the side of the house, exposing an infestation of wasps and mice. An extension to the house is destroyed for being too close to a neighbor's residence, and the rest of the inheritance money is spent on fixing the hole. Later, Susan tells Greg that his school's funding is being cut due to low scores on the test, because, according to Greg, a kid had led the stress lizard out of its cage during the school-wide test, suggesting that they move neighborhoods to a new school district. Greg is excited about the idea of being in a new school, but worries about leaving Rowley behind. When Greg and his family tour a house, they like it and want to move in. Greg's family attempts to sell their own house, which is successful when a family chooses to buy it on the condition that the hot tub is removed.

The day after Greg tries to explain his departure to Rowley, he sees that construction is already being done on his house and the Heffleys rush to get all their belongings out. A worker hurries to remove the hot tub, lifting it with a crane. He is distracted by wasps and the hot tub falls through the roof, creating a large hole in the house. The buyers now decide against moving in, and Greg admits that he was not ready to move, glad to remain Rowley's best friend.

Background
Wrecking Balls author and illustrator, Jeff Kinney, decided on the book's theme while doing renovations to his own house. He realized that he had not yet written a book about Greg moving and considered the idea a good fit for the series. Wrecking Balls title and cover were revealed on May 14, 2019 on Twitter by Kinney.

To promote the book, Kinney hosted a book tour called The Wrecking Ball Show, as a follow-up to the previous book promotion, The Meltdown Show. It lasted for 33 days across multiple countries: Italy, Germany, France, Greece, Bulgaria, Spain, and Portugal. The show's activities were decided live through spinning a wheel; activities included a dancing competition, a tower-building contest with foam blocks, and a trivia challenge.

Kinney used systematic inventive thinking to come up with jokes for the book. He elaborated that "[it] helps me generate ideas without having to rely on memories. [...] In it, problem-solving is based on templates. If you can use those templates to harness your creativity, then you can solve problems more quickly than you could another way." Kinney described moments from the book in which a kitchen remodel leads to a larger construction project and a hot tub is lifted over the house as based on true experiences. He concluded by describing Wrecking Ball as his "best-written book."

On the subject of the high amount of illustrations in the novel, Kinney stated that the Diary of a Wimpy Kid series is closer to being "long-form comics" rather than a graphic novel." He described the latest Diary of a Wimpy Kid books as requiring many illustrations due to being more "cinematic," then criticized the earlier books for being "sparse and minimalistic."

Themes
Kinney has stated that the theme of the book is "Greg letting go of his childhood home." He found that the best way to open the book would be to have Greg clean out his closet and try to sell objects at a yard sale, reflecting him "letting go of his childhood possessions." While discussing his overseas book tour, Kinney wrote that he sees the series as "a mirror." He explains that the books are popular worldwide because "childhood is universal" and children around the world all "deal with the same kinds of things."

Reception
In its first week, Wrecking Ball sold slightly less than 200,000 copies. , it has sold over 650,000 copies.

Wrecking Ball received generally positive reviews from critics. Kirkus Reviews commented that "Readers can still rely on this series to bring laughs." Carrie R. Wheadon from Common Sense Media gave the book four out of five stars and praised it for having positive messages.

References

 ihr seid dumm

Diary of a Wimpy Kid
American children's novels
2019 children's books
2019 American novels
Novels by Jeff Kinney
Novels about moving
Amulet Books books